This is the discography for American jazz musician Lou Donaldson.

As leader 

 1952: New Faces New Sounds (Lou Donaldson Quintet/Quartet) (Blue Note BLP 5021) [10" LP]
 1953: New Faces New Sounds (Lou Donaldson/Clifford Brown Quintet) (Blue Note BLP 5030) [10" LP]
 1952-54: Quartet/Quintet/Sextet (Blue Note BLP 1537, 1957)
 1954: Lou Donaldson Sextet, Vol. 2 (Blue Note BLP 5055) [10" LP]
 1957: Wailing With Lou (Blue Note BLP 1545, 1957)
 1957: Swing and Soul (Blue Note BLP 1566, 1957)
 1957: Lou Takes Off (Blue Note BLP 1591, 1958)
 1958: Blues Walk (Blue Note BLP 1593, 1958)
 1958: Light-Foot (Blue Note BLP 4053, 1960)
 1959: LD + 3 with The Three Sounds (Blue Note BLP 4012, 1959)
 1959: The Time Is Right (Blue Note BLP 4025, 1960)
 1960: Sunny Side Up (Blue Note BLP 4036, 1961)
 1960: Midnight Sun (Blue Note/UA LT-1028, 1980)
 1961: Here 'Tis (Blue Note BLP 4066, 1961)
 1961: Gravy Train (Blue Note BLP 4079, 1962)
 1961: A Man With a Horn (Blue Note/EMI 21436, 1999)
 1962: The Natural Soul (Blue Note BLP 4108, 1963)
 1963: Good Gracious! (Blue Note BLP 4125, 1964)

 1963: Signifyin' (Argo LP 724, 1963)
 1964: Possum Head (Argo LP 734, 1964)
 1964: Cole Slaw (Argo LP 747, 1964)
 1964: Rough House Blues (Cadet LPS 768, 1965)
 1965: Musty Rusty (Argo LPS 759, 1965)
 1965: Fried Buzzard (Cadet LPS 842, 1970) – live
 1966: Blowing in the Wind (Cadet LPS 789)
 1966: Lou Donaldson at His Best (Cadet LPS 815, 1967) – this is NOT a "best of/hits" compilation; it is an album of all new session recordings.

 1967: Sweet Slumber (Blue Note [Japan] GXF 3068, 1980) – reissued as Lush Life (Blue Note BST 84254, 1986)
 1967: Alligator Bogaloo (Blue Note BLP 4263, 1967)
 1967: Mr. Shing-A-Ling (Blue Note BLP 4271, 1968)
 1968: Midnight Creeper (Blue Note BST 84280, 1968)
 1968: Say It Loud! (Blue Note BST 84299, 1969)
 1969: Hot Dog (Blue Note BST 84318, 1969)
 1969-70: Everything I Play Is Funky (Blue Note BST 84337, 1970)
 1970: Pretty Things (Blue Note BST 84359, 1970)
 1970: The Scorpion: Live At The Cadillac Club (Blue Note/EMI 31876, 1995) – live
 1971: Cosmos (Blue Note BST 84370, 1971)
 1972: Sophisticated Lou (Blue Note/UA BN-LA 024-G, 1973)
 1973: Sassy Soul Strut (Blue Note/UA BN-LA 109-F, 1973)
 1974: Sweet Lou (Blue Note/UA BN-LA 259-G, 1974)

 1976: A Different Scene (Cotillion SD 9905, 1976)
 1977: Color as a Way of Life (Cotillion SD 9915, 1977)
 1981: Sweet Poppa Lou (Muse MR 5247, 1981)
 1981: Forgotten Man (Timeless SJP 153, 1982)
 1981: Back Street (Muse MR 5292, 1982)
 1984: Live in Bologna (Timeless SJP 202, 1986) – live
 1990: Play the Right Thing (Milestone	MCD 9190, 1991)
 1992: Birdseed (Milestone MCD 9198, 1992)
 1993: Caracas (Milestone MCD 9217, 1993)
 1994: Sentimental Journey (Columbia	CK 66790, 1995)
 1999: Relaxing at Sea: Live on the QE2 (Chiaroscuro CRD 366, 2000) – live

Compilations 
 Ha' Mercy (Cadet 2CA 60007, 1971) [2LP]
 The Best of Lou Donaldson: Signifyin'  (Affinity/Charly ARC-509, 1991) 
 The Best of Lou Donaldson, Volume 1: (1957-1967) (Blue Note/EMI 27298, 1993)
 The Righteous Reed! The Best of Poppa Lou (Blue Note/EMI 30721, 1994) – recorded 1967-73
 The Best of Lou Donaldson, Vol. II: The Blue Note Years (Blue Note/EMI 37745, 1996) – recorded 1967-70
 Blue Breakbeats (Blue Note/EMI 94709, 1998)
 The Artist Selects (Blue Note/EMI 31434, 2005)

As sideman 

With Art Blakey
A Night at Birdland Vol. 1 (Blue Note, 1954) [10" LP]
A Night at Birdland Vol. 2 (Blue Note, 1954) [10" LP]
A Night at Birdland Vol. 3 (Blue Note, 1954) [10" LP]

With Jimmy Smith
 A Date with Jimmy Smith Volume One (Blue Note, 1957)
 A Date with Jimmy Smith Volume Two (Blue Note, 1957)
 Jimmy Smith at the Organ Vol. One (Blue Note, 1957)
 Jimmy Smith at the Organ Vol. Two (Blue Note, 1957)
 House Party (Blue Note, 1958)
 The Sermon! (Blue Note, 1959) – recorded 1957-58
 Rockin' the Boat (Blue Note, 1963)
 Confirmation (Blue Note, 1979) – recorded 1958
 Cool Blues (Blue Note, 1980) – recorded live in 1958
 Jimmy Smith Trio + LD (Blue Note, 1985) – recorded 1957

With Gene Ammons
All Star Sessions (Prestige, 1956) – recorded 1950-55

With Clifford Brown
Memorial Album (Blue Note, 1956) – recorded 1953

With Milt Jackson
 Milt Jackson: Wizard of the Vibes (Blue Note, 1952) – recorded 1948-52
 All Star Bags (Blue Note, 1976) [2LP] – compilation/recorded 1952-57

With Junior Mance
 Mance (Chiaroscuro, 2000) also with Etta Jones – recorded  1998 

With Thelonious Monk
 Genius of Modern Music: Volume 1 (Blue Note, 1951) – recorded 1947
 Genius of Modern Music: Volume 2 (Blue Note, 1952) – recorded 1951-52

With Horace Silver
 Horace Silver Quartet With Lou Donaldson: Live In New York 1953 (Solar, 2014) – recorded live in 1953

References 

Discographies of American artists
Jazz discographies